Tyler Toffoli (born April 24, 1992) is a Canadian professional ice hockey right winger for the Calgary Flames of the National Hockey League (NHL). He was drafted by the Los Angeles Kings in the second round, 47th overall, of the 2010 NHL Entry Draft.

Early life
Toffoli was born in Scarborough, Ontario, to Rob and Mandy Toffoli; he has two older sisters Megan and Courtney. His father Rob was also involved in hockey and was the general manager of the Toronto Jr. Canadiens while Toffoli played with them. Growing up, Toffoli attended Birchmount Park Collegiate Institute in Toronto (into which Scarborough had amalgamated in 1998) and Hillcrest High School in Ottawa.

Playing career

Major junior
Toffoli was drafted seventh overall by the Ottawa 67's in the 2008 OHL Draft. At the conclusion of his rookie season, Toffoli was named to the First All-Rookie Team.

In 2010, Toffoli was drafted 169th overall by Traktor Chelyabinsk in the 2010 KHL Draft but chose to stay in the OHL. He was later drafted 47th overall by the Los Angeles Kings in the 2010 NHL Entry Draft.

Toffoli signed a three-year entry-level contract with the Kings on April 19, 2011. He played that season with the 67's before joining the Manchester Monarchs in the American Hockey League to begin his professional career.

Los Angeles Kings
On March 16, 2013, Toffoli made his NHL debut in a 5–2 win over the San Jose Sharks. Toffoli scored his first career NHL goal on goaltender Mike Smith in his second NHL game in a 4–0 victory over the Phoenix Coyotes on March 18, 2013. On April 12, 2013, Toffoli was named the recipient of the AHL's Dudley "Red" Garrett Memorial Award for rookie of the year in the 2012–13 season. He scored 28 goals and 20 assists (48 points) in 55 AHL games for Manchester during the season, and upon the announcement, Toffoli led all rookies in goals, short-handed goals (3) and plus-minus (+20).

On May 8, 2013, Toffoli made his Stanley Cup playoff debut in Game 5 of the Western Conference Quarterfinals against the St. Louis Blues, replacing scratched Keaton Ellerby in the Kings' lineup.

To begin the 2013–14 season, the Kings assigned Toffoli to their AHL team in Manchester. On November 9, in his third game since being recalled to the NHL with Manchester linemate Linden Vey, Toffoli scored two goals and one assist in Los Angeles' 5–1 victory over the Vancouver Canucks, the first three-point game of his NHL career. Toffoli then contributed another two-goal performance, including the eventual game-winner, against the St. Louis Blues, on December 2 in a 3–2 Kings victory. The game-winning goal marked his fourth in 14 games since he had been recalled from the Monarchs. Toffoli was a key contributor in the playoffs and would go on the win the Stanley Cup, assisting on Alec Martinez's Stanley Cup winning goal in 2OT of Game 5.

In the 2014–15 season, Toffoli played a majority of the season with Jeff Carter and Tanner Pearson on a line dubbed "That 70s Line" because all three wore numbers in the 70s. During the 2014–15 season, on January 9, 2015, Toffoli was diagnosed with mononucleosis, forcing him to miss six games before rejoining the lineup on January 31 against the Chicago Blackhawks. He scored his first career NHL hat-trick on February 12 in the Kings' 5–2 victory over the Calgary Flames.

During the 2016–17 NHL season, Toffoli suffered a left knee injury, forcing him to miss 19 games. He underwent successful surgery on April 25. On June 7, 2017, the Kings signed Toffoli to a three-year, $13.8 million extension, with an annual average of $4.6 million.

On February 15, 2020, Toffoli became the first player in league history to record a hat-trick in an outdoor game when the Kings defeated the Colorado Avalanche 3-1 during the 2020 NHL Stadium Series. The game was played at Falcon Stadium in Colorado Springs, Colorado.

Vancouver Canucks
However, 2 days later, Toffoli was traded by the Kings to the Vancouver Canucks on February 17, 2020, in exchange for Tim Schaller, Tyler Madden, a 2020 second-round pick, and a 2022 conditional pick. Toffoli found success on the Canucks' top line alongside J.T. Miller and Elias Pettersson, putting up 10 points in 10 games, including six goals. When the NHL season resumed for the playoffs, Toffoli would suffer a high-ankle sprain in Game 1 of the qualifying series against the Minnesota Wild. He wouldn't return to the lineup until August 25, 2020, in time for Game 2 of the second-round series against the Vegas Golden Knights. Toffoli contributed a goal and two assists in his return to the lineup as the Canucks tied the series. However, he had just one goal the rest of the series as the Canucks bowed out in seven games. Despite the Canucks having traded for Toffoli, the team's general manager, Jim Benning, did not attempt to re-sign him.

Montreal Canadiens
On October 12, 2020, Toffoli signed a four-year, $17 million contract with the Montreal Canadiens. In his first game against the Canucks on January 20, Toffoli recorded a hat-trick in a 6–5 shootout loss for the Canadiens. Toffoli managed 28 goals and 16 assists in 52 games during the pandemic-shortened 2020–21 season, the seventh-best goal tally for a player in the NHL that season. He continued to enjoy success during the Canadiens' deep run during the playoffs, notably scoring the series-winning goal in the team's second round against the Winnipeg Jets. Toffoli played in his second Stanley Cup Final, though he was struggling with a groin injury by the end of the playoffs and did not register any points in his final six games.

While the Canadiens had a historically poor start to the 2021–22 season, Toffoli recorded five goals and 12 assists in his first 26 games, jockeying for the overall points lead with Nick Suzuki. On December 11, it was announced that Toffoli had undergone hand surgery and was expected to miss eight weeks. However, due to a faster than expected recovery, Toffoli returned only a month later, managing a goal and an assist in a 5–3 victory over the Dallas Stars. With the team under the new management of Jeff Gorton and Kent Hughes, there was increasing speculation Toffoli would soon be traded as part of a rebuild. Speaking on the subject, Toffoli said, "I've been traded before and I know better not to get caught up in the rumours. Whatever direction they feel they want to go in, I want to be part of it." Following his subsequent trade, teammate Nick Suzuki commented "it's tough to lose a good friend and good teammate."

Calgary Flames
On February 14, 2022, Toffoli was traded to the Calgary Flames for Tyler Pitlick, Emil Heineman, a first-round pick in 2022, and a fifth-round pick in 2023. The trade reunited him with former Kings coach Darryl Sutter and past teammates Trevor Lewis, Milan Lucic, Sean Monahan, Chris Tanev and Jacob Markström. Making his Flames debut on February 15, he scored his first goal with the team that night in a 6–2 rout of the Columbus Blue Jackets. Toffoli scored seven goals in his first ten games with the team, but by the end of the regular season was on a pronounced scoring drought. The Flames won the Pacific Division, and advanced into the 2022 Stanley Cup playoffs to meet the Dallas Stars in the first round. Toffoli's scoring drought extended into the postseason, recording only a secondary assist in the first six games of the series, stymied by a stellar performance by Stars netminder Jake Oettinger. In Game 7, Toffoli scored his first goal of the postseason, ending a 16-game goalless streak, helping the Flames win the series. The Flames drew the Edmonton Oilers in the second round, the first playoff "Battle of Alberta" in 31 years. The Flames were defeated by the Oilers in five games, bringing the playoff run to an end.

The offseason brought major changes for the Flames organization, with the departures of star wingers Johnny Gaudreau and Matthew Tkachuk. As a result, Toffoli was moved onto the team's top line alongside Elias Lindholm and newcomer Jonathan Huberdeau. He called it "a great opportunity." On December 7, 2022, Toffoli scored his 200th career NHL goal in a loss to the Carolina Hurricanes.

Career statistics

Regular season and playoffs

International

Awards and honours

References

External links

 
 

1992 births
Living people
Calgary Flames players
Canadian expatriate ice hockey players in the United States
Canadian ice hockey centres
Canadian people of Italian descent
Los Angeles Kings draft picks
Los Angeles Kings players
Manchester Monarchs (AHL) players
Montreal Canadiens players
Ottawa 67's players
Sportspeople from Scarborough, Toronto
Ice hockey people from Toronto
Stanley Cup champions
Vancouver Canucks players